Sensible Shoes is the fourth album by Led Bib.  Released on 4 May 2009, it was shortlisted for the 2009 Mercury Prize.

Track listing

 "Yes, Again" – 4:55
 "Squirrel Carnage" – 7:10
 "Early Morning" – 7:10
 "Sweet Chilli" – 5:22
 "2:4:1 [Still Equals None]" – 5:56
 "Call Centre Labyrinth" – 7:00
 "Water Shortage" – 7:11
 "Falt Pack Fantasy" – 4:49
 "Zone 4" – 9:07

References 

2009 albums
Led Bib albums
Cuneiform Records albums